

Paul Drekmann (13 November 1893 – 9 March 1960) was a German general during World War II. He was a recipient of the Knight's Cross of the Iron Cross of Nazi Germany.

Awards and decorations

 Knight's Cross of the Iron Cross on 28 March 1945 as Generalleutnant and commander of 252. Infanterie-Division

References

Citations

Bibliography

 

1893 births
1960 deaths
Military personnel from Hamburg
Lieutenant generals of the German Army (Wehrmacht)
German Army personnel of World War I
Recipients of the clasp to the Iron Cross, 1st class
German military personnel of the Spanish Civil War
Recipients of the Gold German Cross
Recipients of the Knight's Cross of the Iron Cross
German prisoners of war in World War II held by the United Kingdom